Malvern is a town in Geneva County, Alabama, United States. It is part of the Dothan, Alabama Metropolitan Statistical Area. At the 2010 census the population was 1,448, up from 1,215 in 2000.

Geography
Malvern is located at  (31.143981, -85.523382).

Demographics

According to the 1910 U.S. Census, Malvern was incorporated in 1904.

2000 census
As of the census of 2000, there were 1,215 people, 485 households, and 370 families residing in the town. The racial makeup of the town was 94.57% White, 2.22% Black or African American, 1.15% Native American, 0.25% Asian, 1.07% from other races, and 0.74% from two or more races. 1.32% of the population were Hispanic or Latino of any race.

There were 485 households, out of which 36.1% had children under the age of 18 living with them, 60.2% were married couples living together, 11.5% had a female householder with no husband present, and 23.7% were non-families. 21.0% of all households were made up of individuals, and 7.6% had someone living alone who was 65 years of age or older. The average household size was 2.51 and the average family size was 2.89.

In the town, the population was spread out, with 26.1% under the age of 18, 6.7% from 18 to 24, 31.4% from 25 to 44, 24.6% from 45 to 64, and 11.2% who were 65 years of age or older. The median age was 36 years. For every 100 females, there were 97.9 males. For every 100 females age 18 and over, there were 93.1 males.

The median income for a household in the town was $31,850, and the median income for a family was $37,813. Males had a median income of $29,701 versus $19,500 for females. The per capita income for the town was $15,283. About 12.1% of families and 14.3% of the population were below the poverty line, including 18.8% of those under age 18 and 23.3% of those age 65 or over.

2010 census
As of the census of 2010, there were 1,448 people, 582 households, and 428 families residing in the town. The racial makeup of the town was 91.2% White, 4.8% Black or African American, .7% Native American, 0.1% Asian, 1.7% from other races, and 1.5% from two or more races. 4.8% of the population were Hispanic or Latino of any race.

There were 485 households, out of which 29.4% had children under the age of 18 living with them, 58.2% were married couples living together, 11.9% had a female householder with no husband present, and 26.5% were non-families. 22.7% of all households were made up of individuals, and 10.8% had someone living alone who was 65 years of age or older. The average household size was 2.49 and the average family size was 2.92.

In the town, the population was spread out, with 22.8% under the age of 18, 8.8% from 18 to 24, 24.9% from 25 to 44, 29.1% from 45 to 64, and 14.4% who were 65 years of age or older. The median age was 40.3 years. For every 100 females, there were 96.2 males. For every 100 females age 18 and over, there were 93.8 males.

The median income for a household in the town was $42,930, and the median income for a family was $41,793. Males had a median income of $40,875 versus $35,486 for females. The per capita income for the town was $21,417. About 9.6% of families and 11.1% of the population were below the poverty line, including 13.8% of those under age 18 and 6.9% of those age 65 or over.

2020 census

As of the 2020 United States census, there were 1,536 people, 614 households, and 407 families residing in the town.

References

External links
WiregrassNews.com - Local Internet News Site

Towns in Geneva County, Alabama
Towns in Alabama
Dothan metropolitan area, Alabama